Holiday is a 2001 Russian war drama film directed by Garik Sukachov.

Plot 
The film takes place on June 22, 1941 in one village, which celebrates the birthday of one girl. No one even suspected that in a few hours the war would begin.

Cast 
 Masha Oamer as Nastya
 Aleksandr Baluyev as Yelisey
 Kseniya Kachalina as Country Teacher
 Sasha Korolyov as Genka
 Sergey Batalov as Uncle Sasha
 Olga Blok-Mirimskaya as Aunt Tamara
 Mikhail Efremov as Dzyuba
 Nikolai Pastukhov as Semyon Ivanovich
 Vadim Aleksandrov as Grandpa Kolya
 Viktor Bortsov

References

External links 
 

2001 films
2000s Russian-language films
Russian war drama films
2000s war drama films